Kinzenburg is a municipality in the district of Bitburg-Prüm, in Rhineland-Palatinate, western Germany.

It has had the following population in various censuses since 1815:
	
 Data source: Statistisches Landesamt Rheinland-Pfalz

References

Bitburg-Prüm